Anatomie d'un rapport (English  title: Anatomy of a Relationship; German  title: Anatomie einer Beziehung), is a 1976 French film directed by Luc Moullet and Antonietta Pizzorno. The director plays himself in a docudrama fashion, an actress (Christine Hébert) plays his wife and his real-life partner, Antonietta Pizzorno, co-directs and handles the camera. Unlike more conventional drama centered narrative film, Anatomie d'un Rapport presents itself as a diary.

Plot
A woman's feminist awakening drives an intellectual couple to a relationship crisis.

Cast
 Luc Moullet 
 Christine Hébert
 Viviane Berthommier
 Antonietta Pizzorno

References

External links

French drama films
1976 films
1970s French films